Raymond Bruckert (born in Biel/Bienne, Canton of Bern, on November 19, 1935) is an author of Swiss novels, geography textbooks for primary education, as well as other technical and educational publications. He began to write novels shortly after his retirement.

Biography

A Doctor of Science from the University of Bern in geography, he is first and foremost a teacher and directs development courses, while doing research in solar energy. He began at age 18 as a teacher for all levels of the single class of Romont, a small village in the Bernese Jura. He then became the official translator in the city of Biel in charge of cultural affairs in French and municipal statistician.

In the meantime, he taught at the commercial school in Biel.  School managers in Neuchâtel concluded his career as director of the school in Moutier. He is under regular review of the Jura region for the magazine Jura pluriel and is a member of the Association des écrivains neuchâtelois et jurassiens in Jura. He lives in Plagne, a village north of Romand Biel.

Publications

1970 Bienne, son agglomération, sa région
1976 L'Agriculture mondiale
1977 L'Industrie dans le monde
1980 Le Soleil pour tous – Initiation of solar energy practice, Randin
2000 Chronique d'un grand froid, Cabédita (novel)
2001 Le Rire interdit : apogée et chute d'une utopie (novel)
2003 A la recherche du bonnet magique, Le Champ de la Draize, Plagne (novel)
2006 Les Veillées de jadis, Editions Intervalles, Prêles (novel)

References

French article

1935 births
Living people
People from Biel/Bienne
Swiss writers